Cringe is a compilation album by The Clay People, released in 1995 by record label Out of Line. It compiles most of the band's second album The Iron Icon with remixes and two tracks from the debut.

Track listing

Personnel
Adapted from the Cringe liner notes.

Clay People
 Kevin Bakerian – drums
 Alex Eller – keyboards, programming, production
 Daniel Neet – lead vocals
 Karla Williams – electric guitar

Additional musicians
 Duane Beer – loops, sampler
 Burton C. Bell – backing vocals (4, 5, 8, 12)
 Alex Welz – backing vocals (7)

Production and design
 Chase – art direction
 Van Christie – production, recording and mixing (4, 5, 7-9)
 James Galas – illustrations
 Jason McNinch – production, recording and mixing (4, 5, 7-9)
 Jeff Motch – design
 Mud – mastering
 Adam Yoffe – production, recording and mixing (4, 5, 7-9)

Release history

References

External links 
 Cringe at Discogs (list of releases)

1995 compilation albums
The Clay People albums